The Franklin Township Public Library (FTPL) is a public library system in Franklin Township, Somerset County, New Jersey. The library offers numerous programs and events to its diverse population. With two different locations, the Franklin Township Public Library is the public library system for the township of Franklin, Somerset County, New Jersey, United States.

Locations 
The Demott Lane Branch, located in the Somerset section of Franklin, is considered the 'Main Library'. A satellite branch called the Franklin Park Library or South Branch is located in the Franklin Town Center on Route 27 at South Middlebush Road.

In the Fall of 2021 it is expected to open a satellite branch at the newly built Franklin Township Youth Center at 427 Lewis Street. This will be the North Branch or Youth Center Library (will open to the public not just kids & teens).

The Franklin Park Library is also planning to relocate to a new building that will be constructed on Baylor Street next to the Franklin Park Elementary School. Construction is expected to start Fall of 2021 as well.

Library departments 

Adult Services: The functions of the Adult Services department are to develop and maintain an appropriate materials collection for adults; to provide readers’ advisory, reference and information services; to provide public programs; and to engage organizations and individuals in the community and build partnerships to meet community goals.

Youth Services: Children and teens shall have full access to the total resources of the library and its programs. While service is similar to that for adults, special collections of materials suitable for use by children, teens, caregivers and educators are selected, maintained and interpreted by staff trained in this specialized work and in programming for these age groups.

Circulation services: This  provide efficient service for customers through the charging and discharging of materials, assisting customers with their library card accounts, coordinating inter-branch and external circulation of library materials, and returning library materials to the shelves. This department is often the initial contact with library users and staff are often responsible for interpreting many of our policies and procedures.

Technical services: This department will be responsible for the ordering and processing of library materials and for maintaining the budgetary records of the library’s materials collection. This will include directing and coordinating all functions related to the purchasing and processing of library materials for the system. This department also maintains all items in the collection, repairing or replacing as needed.

Architecture

Franklin Township Public Library is a contemporary design which hugs the farmland with stocky brick columns and overhangs and then soars at the center into a vaulted atrium laced with cables, brackets and open web steel joists. The interior is a metaphor for intellectual flight and everything about it is uplifting including the amount of natural light that streams into the interior. Visitors are immediately impressed with the brightness of the interior and design which pulls patrons in and then rewards them with choices; choice of terrain (multi-leveled children’s' room), choice of location (several glass enclosed quiet study and meeting rooms), and choice of views (a stepped exterior which increases the amount of window wall and outside vistas).

Administration 

January Adams, Director of Library
Lana Savron-Abbott, Head of Youth Services
Michael Ferrante, Head of Adult Services
Megan Ignegno, Head of Circulation Services

Board of Trustees 
As of January 2021:

Nicholas Ciampa, President
Nabil B. Choueiri, Vice President & Treasurer
Iris Kislin, Secretary
Agnes Kulu-Banya
Kevin McNeil
Edward Ward, Superintendent of Schools
Phillip Kramer, Mayor of Franklin Township
Tianna Gresham, Mayor's Alternate

Special programs 

The library has multiple programs regularly scheduled through the month for Adult, Teen and Youth (Children). Their web site has calendars with all events listed and is updated regularly.

Kindle Loans: The library loans out Kindle devices that come with chargers for a 3 week period. Each Kindle contains almost 200  different books and you can request books to be added to the Kindle devices.
Museum Passes: Free passes to area museums and attractions are available to patrons.

Public libraries in New Jersey
Franklin Township, Somerset County, New Jersey